Nenad Vasić (born 28 July 1979) is a Serbian footballer.

Born in Trstenik, he played with FK Jagodina and FK Mladost Lučani in the Serbian SuperLiga.

References

External links
 Profile at Montenegrin Federation site

1979 births
Living people
People from Trstenik, Serbia
Serbian footballers
FK Napredak Kruševac players
FK Mladost Lučani players
FK Jagodina players
Serbian SuperLiga players
FK Srem players
FK Radnički Pirot players
FK Sileks players
Expatriate footballers in North Macedonia
OFK Grbalj players
Association football forwards